The Sharp's Hill Formation is a Bathonian geologic formation in the United Kingdom, dating to around 167 million years ago. Dinosaur remains diagnostic to the genus level are among the fossils that have been recovered from the formation. It is the lateral equivalent of the Rutland Formation and the Fuller's Earth Formation.

The type locality is the Sharp's Hill Quarry.

Paleofauna
 Megalosaurus bucklandii
 Cetiosaurus sp. (sauropod indet)
 "Eoplophysis" (Omosaurus) vetustus'' (stegosaurid indet)

See also

 List of dinosaur-bearing rock formations
 List of stratigraphic units with few dinosaur genera

Footnotes

References
 Weishampel, David B.; Dodson, Peter; and Osmólska, Halszka (eds.): The Dinosauria, 2nd, Berkeley: University of California Press. 861 pp. .

Bathonian Stage